Shihad is the third studio album released by New Zealand rock band, Shihad.

Released in New Zealand in September 1996 on the Wildside Records label, it is sometimes known as "the fish album" - a reference to the fish that feature in the album's artwork.

The album was dedicated to the memory of the band's manager and friend, Gerald Dwyer, who had died earlier that year.

The album was recorded at York Street Studios, Auckland, New Zealand and produced & engineered by Malcolm Welsford. Tracks include the singles "La La Land", "A Day Away", "Home Again" and "Yr Head Is A Rock". "It's A Go" was released as a single in Europe and "Ghost From The Past"  as a single in Australia. "Home Again" went on to be one of New Zealand's biggest hits of all time.

Track listing
"Home Again" - 3:35
"Ghost From The Past" - 2:58
"Hate Boys" - 4:09
"It's A Go" - 3:31
"La La Land" - 2:30
"Attack" - 3:08
"Pig Bop" - 5:05
"Leo Song" - 3:29
"A Day Away" - 2:27
"Yr' Head Is A Rock" - 3:53
"Missionary" - 1:43
"Outta Phase" - 3:29
"Boat Song" - 4:53

Credits 
 All songs by: Shihad
 Produced by: Shihad & Malcolm Welsford
 Assistant Engineer: Aron Ross
 Mixed by: Malcolm Welsford except 1 - 4, and 9 mixed by Adam Kaspar
 Mastered by: Dave Collins

Certifications

References

1996 albums
Shihad albums